Cymuned (translated in English as "community") was a Welsh communities pressure group. Established in 2001, the group campaigned on behalf of local communities in Wales, particularly (but not exclusively) Welsh-speaking and rural ones, which it perceived to be under threat due to  demographic change.

They protested against the Welsh train company Arriva Trains Wales for the lack of use of the Welsh language on its services, and the holiday agents Thomas Cook for banning the use of Welsh in its Bangor branch in 2007.

Critics argued that estate agents were providing a commercial service to the Welsh people who contracted them to sell or rent their property in return for market value and that the sharp rise in the cost of property in recent years was not confined to Wales but an international phenomenon of the growing world economy, however Cymuned argued that there was a need to create a secondary sustainable local housing market in rural Wales. A new campaign designed to ensure that a sustainable proportion of new homes should be for locals only is based on planning policy that had already been adopted in the Yorkshire Dales National Park, as well as parts of Shropshire, Devon, the Peak District and the Lake District.

Cymuned also campaigned on behalf of the Rhostyllen community near Wrexham against plans by the National Trust to develop land next to the village for high-priced housing.

The chief executive of Cymuned was Aran Jones, who had learnt Welsh as a second language. Other notable members included the poet and musician, Twm Morys (who won the chair at the 2003 national eisteddfod), Dr Simon Brooks, former editor of the Welsh language current affairs magazine Barn, Judith Humphreys, a Welsh actress and Dr Jerry Hunter, an American Harvard graduate who moved to Wales to learn Welsh and has remained in Wales ever since, working in academic posts at the University of Wales.

See also
 Cymdeithas yr Iaith Gymraeg
 List of political movements in Wales

References

External links 
Cymuned's main website
The Homes4Locals.com campaign site

Welsh language
Welsh nationalism
Political advocacy groups in Wales
Organizations established in 2001
2001 establishments in Wales
2001 establishments in the United Kingdom
Campaigns and movements in Wales